Antopetitia is a genus of flowering plants in the legume family, Fabaceae. It belongs to the subfamily Faboideae.

Members within the genus bear odd-pinnately compound leaves with five to eleven leaflets. Stipules are reduced to glands. Inflorescences are pedunculate umbels borne in axillae. Flowers each have a gamosepalous but toothed calyx and a corolla of petals each divided into a claw and limb of equal or near-equal length. Each fruit consists of two to five one-seeded segments, each of which dehisce into two valves upon maturity.

References

Loteae
Fabaceae genera